is a 1992 Japanese horror film directed by Kei Kumai and produced by actor Taketoshi Naito. It was entered into the 42nd Berlin International Film Festival. The film has yet to see an NTSC home media release, nor even one with an English translation.

Cast
 Rentarō Mikuni as headmaster / ship captain
 Hisashi Igawa as prosecutor
 Satoko Iwasaki
 Taketoshi Naito as novelist
 Eiji Okuda as Nishikawa
 Chishū Ryū as judge
 Tetta Sugimoto as Goro
 Kunie Tanaka as Hachizo
 Masane Tsukayama as lawyer

References

External links

1992 films
1990s Japanese-language films
1992 horror films
Films directed by Kei Kumai
Japanese horror films
1990s Japanese films